In the Middle of the Night is a young adult suspense novel by Robert Cormier. It was published in 1995.

Plot
This novel follows 16-year-old Denny Colbert, whose father was involved in a tragic accident that killed 22 children. He is not allowed to drive or answer the phone and his family moves so often that he is always the new kid in school. However, one afternoon, Denny disobeys his parents and answers a phone call, after which he finds himself drawn into a relationship with the mystery caller, someone who wants revenge.

Awards
 1996 ALA Best Books for Young Adults
 1997 Texas TAYSHAS High School Reading List
 1996 ALA Quick Pick for Young Adult Reluctant Readers

References

1995 American novels
Novels by Robert Cormier
American thriller novels
American young adult novels